Kent Pride is an LGBTQ community group which organises an annual LGBTQ+ pride event held each July in Kent in the United Kingdom and provides a community support network to the LGBTQ community.

Events 
Kent Pride has announced plans for two annual events, a live-streamed event in January 2022 and a Pride Festival event in summer 2022. The venue for the 2022 Pride Festival event has not been announced, but is confirmed as being in West Kent.

Community work 
As well as an annual event, Kent Pride is an LGBTQ community support organisation, which advocates for equality for the LGBTQ community.

In June 2021, Kent Pride sent a message of support to Kent County Council to thank them for raising the Pride flag above County Hall, Maidstone. In response, The Chairman of Kent County Council, Ann Allen MBE said "“I am grateful to colleagues in Kent Pride, who have sent messages of support that go some way to show how much the Pride Flag means to their members."

In April 2021, Kent Pride wrote to Kent Police with concerns about a rise in LGBTQ hate crime. As a result, Kent Pride created a guide to reporting hate crime and getting victim support.

References

External links 

Pride parades in England
Summer events in England
LGBT organisations in England
Organisations based in Kent